Eddie Hughes (born May 28, 1960) is an American former professional basketball player who played three years in the National Basketball Association (NBA).

Basketball career
A 5'10" (178 cm) point guard born in Greenville, Mississippi, Hughes played collegiately at Colorado State University from 1978 to 1982. He was selected in the seventh round of the 1982 NBA draft by the San Diego Clippers.

Hughes' NBA playing career began in 1987 with the Utah Jazz, for whom he played 11 games, averaging 1.5 points and 0.7 assists per game. He then played a total of 86 games with the Denver Nuggets in his second and third seasons, his last year being in 1989–90.

External links
Stats at BasketballReference

1960 births
Living people
20th-century African-American sportspeople
21st-century African-American people
African-American basketball players
Albuquerque Silvers players
American men's basketball players
Bay State Bombardiers players
Basketball players from Mississippi
Colorado State Rams men's basketball players
Denver Nuggets players
Grand Rapids Hoops players
La Crosse Catbirds players
Maine Lumberjacks players
Pensacola Tornados (1986–1991) players
Point guards
San Diego Clippers draft picks
Sportspeople from Greenville, Mississippi
Utah Jazz players
Wyoming Wildcatters players